Gugalwa (Guglwa) is a small village in Rajasthan, Western India. It is served by Gugalwa Kirtan Halt Railway Station. There are two other villages, Kirtan and Bas Bhabrind, nearby.

Gugalwa Name included as a new Panchayat in  churu District.
In Gugalwa Panchayat Villages are:-1)Kirtan 2) Bas Bharind 3). Balan 4). Chanani ki dani. 5). Gugalwa.

Gugalwa is approx 23 km from Pilani and 7 km from Bahel (Haryana).

References

Villages in Churu district